"I Wouldn't Have Missed It for the World" is a song written by Charles Quillen, Kye Fleming and Dennis Morgan, and recorded by American country music singer Ronnie Milsap.  It was released in October 1981 as the second single from the album There's No Gettin' Over Me.  The song became one of his biggest hits in his recording career and came during the peak of his crossover success.

Critical reception
Tom Jurek, a music reviewer and writer for Allmusic, cited "I Wouldn't Have Missed It ..." as "urban cowboy country music in its purest essence," referring to the pop crossover-style of country music that was in vogue during the early 1980s. The song — which prominently featured backing vocals, a harp and acoustic guitar — had a chorus that, wrote Jurek, "is so infectious it could be heard being hummed and whistled on street corners and its words being sung in barrooms and dancehalls throughout the rest of 1981."

Charts
His 19th No. 1 hit on the Billboard Hot Country Singles chart in January 1982, "I Wouldn't Have Missed It For the World" reached No. 20 on the Billboard Hot 100 chart. The song also reached No. 3 on Billboard's Hot Adult Contemporary Singles chart.

A video was also produced of the song, and it has aired on The Nashville Network, CMT and GAC.

References

Works cited
Whitburn, Joel, "Top Country Songs: 1944-2005," 2006.
Whitburn, Joel, "Top Pop Singles: 1955-2006," 2007.

External links
 Ronnie Milsap - I Wouldn't Have Missed It for the World via YouTube

1981 singles
1981 songs
Ronnie Milsap songs
Songs written by Kye Fleming
Songs written by Dennis Morgan (songwriter)
Songs written by Charles Quillen
Song recordings produced by Tom Collins (record producer)
RCA Records singles